North Sheen Cemetery is a cemetery in Kew  in the London Borough of Richmond upon Thames (historically in North Sheen, Surrey). It is managed by Hammersmith and Fulham Council.

The cemetery, which adjoins Mortlake Road (the A205 or South Circular Road) and Lower Richmond Road (the A316), opened in 1909 and is still in use. It is also known as Fulham New Cemetery as it provided burials for the then Metropolitan Borough of Fulham when the old Fulham Cemetery on Fulham Palace Road was full. It has a grid layout of paths and had a temporary chapel, which was replaced by a small red brick chapel in 1931. The chapel is in the gothic style, designed by Arthur Holden, Fulham Borough Surveyor & Engineer, with stained glass by Antoine Acket (1918–1981) added in 1953.

The cemetery includes 110 identified graves of Commonwealth service personnel in the First World War and the Second World War and a memorial garden.

Notable burials

 Antoni Cwojdziński (1896–1972), Polish writer
 Gwyneth Dunwoody (née Phillips; 1930–2008), British Labour Party politician and the longest ever serving female MP in the UK Parliament
 Ferdynand Goetl (1890–1960), Polish writer and political activist who was forced to leave Poland after World War II due to his involvement in the German investigation of the Katyn massacre; he died in exile in London.
 Mateusz Grabowski (1904–1976), Polish pharmacist, owner of the notable Grabowski Gallery in London's Sloane Avenue and philanthropist who donated his majolica collection of pharmaceutical vessels to the Kraków Pharmaceutical Museum and his art collection to the Museum of Art in Łódź and the Warsaw National Museum.
 Tadeusz Grodyński (1888–1958), Polish economist
 Stanisław Kot (1885–1975), Polish economist and politician. In 1947, in the wake of the communist takeover of Poland, he became a political refugee, living in France and later in the United Kingdom, where he was the leader of the People's Party in exile.
 Herminia Naglerowa (1890–1957), Polish writer
 Witold Narbutt (1900–1957), Polish engineer
 Aleksandra Piłsudska (1882–1963), Polish political activist who was married to Polish leader Józef Piłsudski. She and her daughters fled to London after the German invasion of Poland in September 1939.
 Józef Retinger (1888–1960), Polish political adviser. He was a founder of the European Movement that would lead to the founding of the European Union and also founded the Bilderberg Group, an annual conference established in 1954 to foster dialogue between Europe and North America.
 Tony Smith GC (1894–1964), chimneysweep, who was awarded the George Cross for rescuing people from a bomb-damaged building in London in 1944. He was initially buried in an unmarked grave. In 1999 a new stone was dedicated by arrangement of the Royal Marines Association and supported by the Victoria Cross and George Cross Association, the Royal Marines Historical Societies and representatives from the Royal Borough of Kensington and Chelsea.
 Raine Spencer, Countess Spencer (1929–2016), British socialite, stepmother of Diana, Princess of Wales
 Wiesław Strzałkowski (1909–1988), Polish poet
 Charles Wells (1841–1922), British gambler and fraudster who, famously, broke the bank at Monte Carlo
 Adam Żółtowski (1881–1958), Polish linguist
 Henry Chaney(1882 – 1919) a British sports shooter and inventor of the first practical gun camera

See also
 Mortlake Cemetery (Hammersmith New Cemetery)

References

External links
 
 The National Archives (UK): North Sheen cemetery. Laying out additional land

1909 establishments in England
Cemeteries in the London Borough of Richmond upon Thames
Commonwealth War Graves Commission cemeteries in England
Hammersmith and Fulham cemeteries
Kew, London